General Sir Cyril Dupré Noyes KCSI CB CIE MC (3 February 1885 – 11 March 1946) was a British officer in the Indian Army.

Personal
Noyes was born in 1885, the son of the Reverend Henry Edward Noyes, D.D. He was educated at St. Lawrence College, Ramsgate and the Royal Military Academy, Woolwich. He married in 1918 Violet Maud Edith, eldest daughter of Colonel H. C. Lucas.

Military career
Noyes was commissioned into the Royal Garrison Artillery 21 December 1904 but transferred to the Indian Army and posted to 2nd Queen Victoria's Own Rajput Light Infantry 23 September 1908.

He served on anti-smuggling operations in the Persian Gulf 1913–14. During World War 1 he served in Egypt during 1914–15 then Mesopotamia in 1916, and was awarded the Military Cross.

Back in India he served on operations on the North West Frontier versus Afghanistan in 1919. He attended the Staff College, Quetta from 1921 to 1922 and later returned there as an instructor from 1927 to 1930, later commanding the 2nd Battalion, 2nd Punjab Regiment. After attendance at the Imperial Defence College, he saw service again in the Mohmand campaign of 1935 as commander of the 2nd Indian Infantry Brigade and again during operations in Waziristan in 1936–37 for which he was awarded the CIE.

He was promoted Commanding Officer of the 2nd battalion, 2nd Punjab Regiment from 16 March 1929 and held command until 15 March 1933. He was appointed commander of the 2nd Indian Infantry Brigade from 6 September 1935 to 25 November 1938. 

He served in World War II as Deputy Quartermaster-General at Army Headquarters India from 1939, as Director of Movements & Quartering at Army Headquarters, India from 1940 and as a District Commander in India from 1941. He went on to be Quartermaster-General at Army Headquarters, India in 1942 and General Officer Commanding-in-Chief North Western Army in 1942. He retired in 1943 and died in 1946.

References

Bibliography

External links
Generals of World War II

 

1885 births
1946 deaths
Academics of the Staff College, Quetta
Indian Army personnel of World War I
British Indian Army generals
Indian Army generals of World War II
Knights Commander of the Order of the Star of India
Companions of the Order of the Bath
Companions of the Order of the Indian Empire
Recipients of the Military Cross
People educated at St Lawrence College, Ramsgate
Graduates of the Royal Military Academy, Woolwich
Royal Garrison Artillery officers
Graduates of the Staff College, Quetta
Graduates of the Royal College of Defence Studies